The 1900 North Monaghan by-election was a parliamentary by-election held for the United Kingdom House of Commons constituency of North Monaghan on 21 December 1900. The vacancy arose because of the death of the sitting member, Daniel MacAleese of the Irish Parliamentary Party. Only one candidate was nominated, Edward Charles Thompson representing the Irish Parliamentary Party, who was elected unopposed.

Result

References

Unopposed by-elections to the Parliament of the United Kingdom in Irish constituencies
1900 elections in the United Kingdom
December 1900 events
By-elections to the Parliament of the United Kingdom in County Monaghan constituencies
1900 elections in Ireland